Stéphane Tissot (born 30 May 1979) is a French former alpine skier who competed in the 2006 Winter Olympics.

External links
 sports-reference.com

1979 births
Living people
French male alpine skiers
Olympic alpine skiers of France
Alpine skiers at the 2006 Winter Olympics
People from Bonneville, Haute-Savoie
Sportspeople from Haute-Savoie
21st-century French people